The Local Rag is a 1986 television film about a suburban newspaper.

It was made as a pilot for a TV series which did not proceed.

References

External links

Australian television films
1986 films
Films directed by Keith Wilkes
1980s English-language films